Saudades, Santa Catarina is a municipality in the state of Santa Catarina in the South region of Brazil. It was created in 1961, its area being taken from the existing municipality of São Carlos; in 1964 its eastern district was removed to form the new municipality of Nova Erechim.

In 2021, five people were killed in a mass stabbing.

See also
List of municipalities in Santa Catarina

References

Municipalities in Santa Catarina (state)